Tordo is a surname. Notable people with the surname include:

 Fernando Tordo (born 1948), Portuguese singer and composer
 Jean-François Tordo (born 1964), French rugby union player 
 João Tordo (born 1975), Portuguese writer

See also
 Tord
 Tormo